Semyon Zherebtsov (born November 23, 1992) is a Russian professional ice hockey player. He is currently playing with Avangard Omsk of the Kontinental Hockey League (KHL).

Zherebtsov made his Kontinental Hockey League debut playing with Avangard Omsk during the 2012–13 KHL season.

References

External links

1992 births
Living people
Avangard Omsk players
Russian ice hockey forwards
Sportspeople from Omsk
Zauralie Kurgan players